A hybrid solar eclipse occurred on December 23, 1908. A solar eclipse occurs when the Moon passes between Earth and the Sun, thereby totally or partly obscuring the image of the Sun for a viewer on Earth. A total solar eclipse occurs when the Moon's apparent diameter is larger than the Sun's, blocking all direct sunlight, turning day into darkness. Totality occurs in a narrow path across Earth's surface, with the partial solar eclipse visible over a surrounding region thousands of kilometres wide.
This event is a hybrid, starting and ending as an annular eclipse. Annularity was visible from Chile, Argentina, Uruguay and southern Brazil, while totality was visible only from southern Atlantic Ocean with no land.

Related eclipses

Solar eclipses 1906–1909

Saros 140 

It is a part of Saros cycle 140, repeating every 18 years, 11 days, containing 71 events. The series started with partial solar eclipse on April 16, 1512. It contains total eclipses from July 21, 1656, through November 9, 1836, hybrid eclipses from November 20, 1854, through December 23, 1908, and annular eclipses from January 3, 1927, through December 7, 2485. The series ends at member 71 as a partial eclipse on June 1, 2774. The longest duration of totality was 4 minutes, 10 seconds on August 12, 1692.

References

1908 12 23
1908 in science
1908 12 23
December 1908 events